La Ciénaga is a town in the San José de Ocoa province of the Dominican Republic.

Sources 
 – World-Gazetteer.com

Populated places in San José de Ocoa Province